Gamma Boötis, Latinised from γ Boötis, is a binary star system in the northern constellation of Boötes the herdsman, forming the left shoulder of this asterism. The primary component has the proper name Seginus , the traditional name of the Gamma Bootis system. It has a white hue and is visible to the naked eye with a typical apparent visual magnitude of +3.03. Based on parallax measurements obtained during the Hipparcos mission, it is located at a distance of approximately 85 light-years from the Sun, but is drifting closer with a radial velocity of −32 km/s.

Properties
The double nature of this system was discovered by American astronomer S. W. Burnham in 1878, and has the discovery code BU 616. The primary or 'A' component of this double star system is designated WDS J14321+3818 ('B' is the star UCAC2 45176266) in the Washington Double Star Catalog. Gamma Boötis' two components are themselves designated WDS J14321+3818Aa (Seginus) and Ab.

[[File:GammaBooLightCurve.png|thumb|left|A light curve for Gamma Boötis, plotted from TESS data]]
The stellar classification of Gamma Boötis is A7IV+(n), matching an A-type star with somewhat "nebulous" lines due to rapid rotation. It was found to be a short-period variable star in 1914 by German astronomers P. Guthnick and R. Prager. Non-radial pulsations were detected in 1992 by Edward J. Kennelly and colleagues. It is a Delta Scuti-type variable star with a period of  that varies from magnitude +3.02 down to +3.07. This dominant mode is 21.28 cycles per day with an amplitude of 0.05 in magnitude. Additional pulsations occur at 18.09, 12.02, 11.70 and 5.06 cycles per day.

These types of stars are usually on the main sequence or slightly evolved. The primary is around one billion years old with 2.1 times the mass of the Sun and five times the Sun's radius. Measurements of the projected rotational velocity range from 115 to 145 km/s, suggesting a high rate of spin.

The system displays a statistically significant infrared excess due to a circumstellar disk.

Nomenclatureγ Boötis (Latinised to Gamma Boötis) is the binary's Bayer designation. WDS J14321+3818 is the wider system's designation in the Washington Double Star Catalog. The designations of the two constituents as WDS J14321+3818A and B, and those of A's components—WDS J14321+3818Aa and Ab—derive from the convention used by the Washington Multiplicity Catalog (WMC) for multiple star systems, and adopted by the International Astronomical Union (IAU).

Gamma Boötis bore the traditional name Ceginus (later Seginus), from cheguius or theguius, apparently Latin mistranscriptions of an Arabic rendering of Greek Boötes. Two possibilities have been suggested: from Arabic بوطس bwṭs, in one of the manuscripts of the Almagest, with undotted ب b mistaken for an undotted ث th, و w taken as w and spelled 'gu', and ط ṭ completely misread, or from Arabic بؤوتس bwʾwts, with undotted ب b mistaken for an undotted ث th, ؤ w-hamza mistaken for غ ġ, و w read as u, and undotted ن n misread as an undotted ى y and transcribed i—that is, as th-g-u-i-s with unwritten vowels (and the Latin grammatical ending -us) filled in for theguius.

In 2016, the IAU organized a Working Group on Star Names (WGSN) to catalogue and standardize proper names for stars. The WGSN decided to attribute proper names to individual stars rather than entire multiple systems. It approved the name Seginus for WDS J14321+3818Aa on 21 August 2016 and it is now so included in the List of IAU-approved Star Names.

Gamma Boötis was listed as Haris in Bečvář, apparently derived from the Arabic name of the constellation of Boötes, Al-Haris Al-Sama meaning "the guard of the north".

In the catalogue of stars in the Calendarium of Al Achsasi al Mouakket, this star was designated Menkib al Aoua al Aisr (منكب العواء الأيسر – mankibu lʿawwaaʾi lʾaysar), which was translated into Latin as Humerus Sinister Latratoris, meaning 'the left shoulder of barker'.

In Chinese astronomy, Gamma Boötis is called 招搖, Pinyin: Zhāoyáo, meaning Twinkling Indicator, because this star is marking itself and standing alone in Twinkling Indicator asterism, Root mansion (see: Chinese constellation). 招搖 (Zhāoyáo), westernized into Chaou Yaou, but the name Chaou Yaou'' was designated for Beta Boötis (Nekkar) by R.H. Allen and the meaning is "to beckon, excite, or move."

Namesake 

USS Seginus (AK-133) was a U.S. Navy Crater-class cargo ship named after the star.

References

External links
 HR 5435
 CCDM J14321+3818

A-type subgiants
Delta Scuti variables
Circumstellar disks
Binary stars

Boötes
Bootis, Gamma
BD+38 2565
Bootis, 27
127762
071075
5435
Seginus